Naganur (K.D.) is a panchayat village in Belgaum district of Karnataka, India.

There are four villages in the Naganur K D gram panchayat: Naganur (K.D.), Aldhal, Bidrewadi, and Naganur (K.M.).

References

Villages in Belagavi district